Hilaroptera is a genus of moths belonging to the family Tineidae. It contains only one species, Hilaroptera viettei, which is found in Madagascar.

This species has a wingspan of 22-28mm, forewings are shiny whitish stramineous with brownish black pattern situated on the upper side of the wing. Many dark dots along costa.

References

Scardiinae
Monotypic moth genera
Moths of Madagascar